Acute hepatomyoencephalopathy (HME) syndrome is the name given to a multi-system disease affecting the liver, muscle and brain which is now known to be caused by phytotoxins. After extensive investigation the culprit has been found to be the beans of a common herb in India, Cassia occidentalis. In many districts of western Uttar Pradesh, Uttarakhand, Odisha and Haryana, India, outbreaks of an acute "encephalopathy" syndrome, dubbed as a "mysterious disease", have been an annual feature for many years. At least 500-700 young previously healthy children had been losing their lives every year in this region. The disease affected rural young children during the winter months of September to December, with fatality rates around 75-80%. It was first assumed it to be a kind of viral encephalitis. Many national investigating agencies failed to diagnose the entity for many years.

Mechanism
The acute severe C. occidentalis poisoning in children affects multiple systems. Functional and biochemical evidences to show toxic effect on the brain, liver and striated muscles. Pathologically there is acute onset massive zonal necrosis of liver and histopathology evidence of acute muscle fibre degeneration. The degenerative changes in the brain are mild, but brain oedema is severe and is believed to be the immediate cause of death.

Treatment

No specific treatment is available as yet. Treatment is mainly symptomatic, may require intensive care management but the outcome is uniformly poor and unpredictable if a full-blown picture of acute HME has appeared.

History
A team of investigators led by a local pediatrician based in Bijnor district, investigated this epidemic in Bijnor, one of the affected districts of western Uttar Pradesh and published their findings as three papers in national peer-reviewed journals. A six-member panel led by virologist Dr Jacob John from Vellore's Christian Medical College & Hospital was constituted by the Odisha state government to investigate into the death of approximately 100 children in Malkangiri district that occurred since September 2015. The deaths were suspected to have occurred due to Japanese encephalitis. In its interim report, the panel indicated that anthraquinone, a toxin found in the 'bada chakunda' (Cassia occidentalis) plant was identified in the urine sample of 5 deceased children thus indicating that some of the children may have died of Encephalopathy, which is caused due to consumption of the plant. At the end of four years, it was concluded that the disease was not encephalitis as so far believed but a fatal multi-system disease affecting liver, muscle and brain called, "acute hepatomyoencephalopathy (HME) syndrome" induced by a phytotoxin.

Criticism of the Cassia Occidentalis poisoning theory 
Local tribals in Malkangiri have argued that Chakunda seeds have been a part of the food habit of local tribes for a very long time and nobody ever discovered it to be lethal. The tribal people also use the root, seeds and leaf of the plant as a traditional medicine for many common ailments. A possible reason maybe that Chakunda seeds have been used to adulterate pulses which are sold to tribal people by unscrupulous traders.

References

Further reading 
Vashishtha VM, Nayak NC, John TJ, Kumar A. Recurrent annual outbreaks of a hepatomyo-encephalopathy syndrome in children in Western Uttar Pradesh, India. Indian J Med Res. 2007; 125: 523-533. Available from: http://icmr.nic.in/ijmr/2009/july/0703.pdf

Vashishtha VM, Kumar A, John TJ, Nayak NC. Cassia occidentalis Poisoning Causes Fatal Coma in Children in Western Uttar Pradesh. Indian Pediatr. 2007 Jul 7; 44(7):522-525. Available from: http://www.indianpediatrics.net/july2007/july-522-525.htm
Vashishtha VM, John TJ, Kumar A. Clinical & pathological features of acute toxicity due to Cassia occidentalis in vertebrates. Indian J Med Res. 2009 Jul;130(1):23-30. Available from: http://icmr.nic.in/ijmr/2009/july/0703.pdf
Panwar RS, Kumar N. Cassia occidentalis toxicity causes recurrent outbreaks of brain disease in children in Saharanpur. Indian J Med Res 2008; 127: 413-414
R.S. Panwar. Disappearance of a deadly disease acute hepatomyoencephalopathy syndrome from Saharanpur. Indian J Med Res. 2012 Jan; 135(1): 131–132. doi: 10.4103/0971-5916.93436
Gupta AK. Cassia occidentalis poisoning causes fatal coma in children in western Uttar Pradesh. Indian Pediatr. 2008 May;45(5):424. 
Nirupam N, Sharma R, Chhapola V, Kanwal SK, Kumar V. Hepatomyoencephalopathy due to Cassia occidentalis poisoning. Indian J Pediatr. 2013 Dec;80(12):1063-4. doi: 10.1007/s12098-012-0928-0. 
Who'll bell the pig? Available from:  Accessed on October 20, 2015. 
Koshy JP. Weed poison may have caused disease outbreak in UP. Available from: http://www.livemint.com/Politics/WaJsZYWsEQxBcx6kPxjOgK/Weed-poison-may-have-caused-disease-outbreak-in-UP-reports.html Accessed on October 20, 2015.
Wild weed poisoning kills 17 children in Bijnor. Maulshree-Seth : Lucknow, Mon Dec 15 2008, 04:14 hrs. http://archive.indianexpress.com/news/wild-weed-poisoning-kills-17-children-in-bijnor/398613/ Accessed on October 20, 2015.

Syndromes
Diseases and disorders in India